Kerhostin (French: Gare de Kerhostin) is a railway station in the village of Kerhostin in the commune of Saint-Pierre-Quiberon, Morbihan department of France. The station was opened on 23 July 1882, and is located on the Auray–Quiberon railway. The station is served by TER Bretagne services operated by the SNCF, between Auray and Quiberon (summer only).

References

External links
 Auray-Quiberon timetable

TER Bretagne
Railway stations in France opened in 1882
Railway stations in Morbihan